Devda is a village in Porbandar district, Gujarat, India. It is on the bank of the Minsar river. The population of the village is around 4000 and most of people are doing farming. And major resources of farming water is wells and tube wells and major crops are cotton, groundnut, onion, and jira. Devda was also famous for its papaya and chilli but farmers no longer grow these crops.

Devda village was in Junagadh District, but it is now in Kutiyana Taluka in Porbandar District of Gujarat State, India. It is 36 km east of District headquarters Porbandar. 19 km from 382 km from the State capital, Gandhinagar. Devda Pin code is 362650 and the postal head office is Kutiyana.

Ramnagar (4 km), Dolatgadh (5 km), Valotra (5 km), Daiyar (6 km), and Aniali (6 km) are nearby villages. Devda is surrounded by Ranavav Taluka towards west, Jamjodhpur Taluka towards North, Bhanvad Taluka towards North, Porbandar Taluka towards west. Ranavav, Porbandar, Manavadar, and Upleta are the nearby cities.

It is near the Arabian sea. There is a chance of humidity in the weather.

Education
Primary Education: There are two separate primary school for boys and girls from standard 1 to 8.

The high school was founded in 1961 and offers commerce and arts streams from standard 9 to 12. For a high school education, many students came from the nearby villages of Rana Khirasara, Khageshri, Iswariya, Ramnagar, Mahobatpara, Sakhpur and Vansjalia. One private school was recently established. Devda Asharam shala is a Government boarding school. The primary school in Devda village was founded in 1879. The Kanya Shala school was founded in 1951. Devda was the second village to have higher secondary education in the Junagadh District. The students of Kutiyana (Tehsil Centre) and other nearby villages commuted to attend the school.

Health facilities
There is a primary Health center, but the required medical staff is not available now.

Financial services
There is state bank of Saurashtra is also available in Devda from many years and now its state bank of India this is very good facility for villagers and most of other neighbor villager are also coming here for the banking and safe deposit locker, ATM, and crop loans are provided at the branch.

Religion
Most of people are Hindu. Shree Ram temple, Shivji temple, Hanuman temple, Chamunda Mataji temple and Balkrishna Haveli are in Devda. There are two or three Muslim families in the town.

Nawabs Bungalow (Mahal)

Before Independence, Devda was ruled by Nawab of Junagadh Devda was last village of his state and there are three other states border are touching 1) Sakhpur (Jamsaheb Jamnagar state) 2) Rana Khirasara  (Rana Saheb Porbandar state)
One of the family member is government teacher work in all over Saurastra region. One shiv temple, Math, is ancient 200 years old. 
A palace has been built by the Navab of Junagadh state on the bank of Minsar river during the year 1926. In Devda (TIMBO) Kansangra Bapa (Patel) and Odedara (Mer) have long been present. The Kadva Patel and Mer communities are large.

Insufficient water for farmers, cattle breeders and households continues, but the main problem is for farmers and cattle breeders in summer. For twenty years, the villagers requested to government to construct a dam on Minsar river which can help more than three villages and finally the government of Gujarat has approved this project and construction is also started by Kisan Infra PVT LTD. New construction of Shree Ramji Temple has been also started. Since 2016 there are a new Ramji temple, a new Dam on Minsar river, and a new entry gate by Aghera families, etc..

References

Villages in Porbandar district